Schrecker or Schreker is a surname. Notable people with the surname include:

Schrecker
Al Schrecker (1917–2000), American basketball player
Ellen Schrecker (born 1938), American historian
Frederick Schrecker (1892-1976), Austrian actor

Schreker
Franz Schreker (originally Schrecker; 1878–1934), Austrian composer, conductor, teacher and administrator

See also
Schreck (disambiguation)